Amitrano is a surname of Southern Italian origin. Notable people with the surname include:

Giorgio Amitrano (born 1957), Italian Japanologist, translator and essayist
Salvatore Amitrano (born 1975), Italian rower
Tim Amitrano (born 1979), Australian equestrian

References

Surnames of Italian origin